The following is a list of programs that are currently broadcast on Antenna TV, a general entertainment network owned by Nexstar Media Group, which is designed for digital subchannel of over-the-air broadcast stations in the United States and was launched on January 1, 2011. The network's programming consists entirely of broadcast syndication of television series from the 1950s to the early 2000s.

Current programming

Sitcoms

Alice
Archie Bunker's Place
Bachelor Father
Barney Miller
Becker
The Benny Hill Show 
Benson 
Bewitched
Dennis the Menace 
Designing Women
Family Ties
Father Knows Best 
The George Burns and Gracie Allen Show
Hazel
I Dream of Jeannie
The Jack Benny Program
The Jeffersons
Maude
McHale's Navy
My Favorite Martian
One Day at a Time
The Partridge Family
Silver Spoons
Soap
That Girl
Three's Company
Too Close for Comfort
Welcome Back, Kotter
Wings

Talk show
Johnny Carson (classic The Tonight Show Starring Johnny Carson episodes from 1972 to 1992)

E/I
Science World
Wild Wonders

References

External links
 

Antenna TV